Epepeotes uncinatus is a species of beetle in the family Cerambycidae. It was described by Charles Joseph Gahan in 1888. It is known from China, Bhutan, Vietnam, Laos, India, and Myanmar. It feeds on Morus australis and three species of Ficus; F. carica F. elastica, and F. religiosa.

References

uncinatus
Beetles described in 1888